New Guilford is an unincorporated community in Perry Township, Coshocton County, Ohio, United States.

History
New Guilford was laid out in 1825 by Dr. Elisha Guilford Lee. A post office was established at New Guilford in 1826, and remained in operation until 1924.

References

Populated places in Coshocton County, Ohio